Daniel Camejo Octavio (23 April 1914 – 30 August 2008) was a Venezuelan sailor. He competed at the 1960 Summer Olympics with his son Peter Camejo and the 1964 Summer Olympics.

Notes

References

External links
 
 

1914 births
2008 deaths
Venezuelan male sailors (sport)
Olympic sailors of Venezuela
Sailors at the 1960 Summer Olympics – Star
Sailors at the 1964 Summer Olympics – Star
Sportspeople from Barquisimeto